The 2009 Cork Premier Intermediate Hurling Championship was the sixth staging of the Cork Premier Intermediate Hurling Championship since its establishment by the Cork County Board in 2004. The championship began on 30 April 2009 and ended on 11 October 2009.

On 17 July 2009, St. Catherine's were relegated from the championship following a 1-10 to 0-9 defeat by Mallow.

On 11 October 2009, Douglas won the championship following a 0-20 to 0-16 defeat of Ballymartle in the final. It remains their only championship title in this grade.

Newcestown's Daniel Twomey was the championship's top scorer with 3-20.

Teams

A total of 16 teams contested the Premier Intermediate Championship, including 14 teams from the 2008 premier intermediate championship, one relegated from the 2008 senior championship and one promoted from the 2008 intermediate championship.

Team changes

To Championship

Promoted from the Cork Intermediate Hurling Championship
 Dripsey

Relegated from the Cork Senior Hurling Championship
 St. Catherine's

From Championship

Promoted to the Cork Senior Hurling Championship
 Blarney

Relegated to the Cork Intermediate Hurling Championship
 Aghada

Results

Round 1

Round 2

Relegation play-offs

Round 3

Quarter-finals

Semi-finals

Final

Championship statistics

Top scorers

Top scorer overall

Top scorers in a single game

Miscellaneous

 Douglas their first Premier Intermediate title.

References

External links
 2009 Cork PIHC results

Cork Premier Intermediate Hurling Championship
Cork Premier Intermediate Hurling Championship